Agarak is a village in the Meghri Municipality of the Syunik Province in southern Armenia, founded in 1949. As of 2011, the population of Agarak was 4,429.

The village is located on the left bank of river Araks River, 9 km southwest of Meghri on the Armenia–Iran border. The border crossing at Agarak is Armenia's sole border crossing with Iran, with the Iranian village of Nurduz being located at the other side of the border. The village had a railway station on the demolished and non-functioning branch of the Yerevan-Nakhchivan-Horadiz railway.

History

Modern-day Agarak is located in the Arevik canton of the historic province of Syunik of Greater Armenia. The area was mentioned in the 12th and 13th centuries by historian Stepanos Orbelian as a rural settlement. However, the region was historically known for its copper and lead mines. The current name of the village is derived from the nearby village of Agarak, literally meaning farm or estate in Armenian.

Two churches dating back to the 17th century lie in the vicinity of Agarak. The church of Surp Amenaprkich (the Holy Saviour), located in the nearby village of Kuris, north of Agarak, and the Aknakhach church in Agarak.

The Geographical and Statistical Dictionary of the Russian Empire, mentions that the village of Agarak, as of 1861, was located in the Ordubad uezd of the Erivan Governorate. The village at that time was notable for the mine and factory located there. According to the publication, in 1860, the village produced 500 pounds of copper.

Agarak was founded in 1949 as a labour settlement to accommodate the workers at the nearby copper-molybdenum combine. In 1954, it gained the status of an urban-type settlement. During the first days of its foundation, the settlement was mainly home to 2-storied residential buildings. Later, with the expansion of the copper-molybdenum combine by the end of the 1970s, 3, 4 and 5-storied buildings were also constructed in the settlement. The workers along with their families were brought to Agarak from the nearby villages, turning Agarak into an important industrial centre at the southern region of the Armenian Soviet Socialist Republic.

Following the independence of Armenia in 1991, Agarak became an urban municipality within the newly formed Syunik Province and the first bridge connecting Armenia to Iran was established. However, as a result of the 2016 administrative reforms, Agarak was downgraded from town to village, thus becoming a rural settlement within the Meghri Municipality.

The village currently has two kindergartens, one secondary school, one art school, a cultural palace, two libraries and a football stadium.

Geography

Agarak is located in semi-desert zone and is surrounded by rocky mountains with high cliffs and deep canyons with an average altitude of 660m. It has a cold desert climate (BWk) according to the Köppen climate classification system. The vicinity of the village is designated as a Prime Butterfly Area, having number of rare and endangered species of butterflies, such as Gegenes nostrodamus, Zegris eupheme, Pieris krueperi, Chazara briseis, Cupido argiades, Pseudophilotes vicrama, and others.

Economy

It is an important centre for non-ferrous metallurgy. In 1853, a copper-molybdenum deposit was discovered, and in 1958 a copper-molybdenum plant was opened in the village, which includes a quarry and a processing plant. The Agarak copper deposit and smeltery have been operating since 1963. The copper-molybdenum industry in Agarak has been recovered since 2001. Currently, the copper-molybdenum plant secures around 1200 jobs for the population of Agarak, which makes around 25% of the entire population of Agarak. The Agarak Copper-Molybdenum mine complex produces copper and molybdenum concentrate through bulk-selective flotation recovery of molybdenum and copper minerals. It was fully acquired by GeoProMining company in 2007.

The Meghri custom house and the border checkpoint with Iran are situated in the territory of Agarak. The construction of the Armenian section of the Iran-Armenia gas pipeline started in Agarak on 30 November 2004. The pipeline started operations on 20 December 2006.

Tourism from Iran is a growing industry in Agarak. Many of the Iranian tourists stop in Meghri and Agarak to go to the restaurants, cafes, and stores. The Persian language is in high demand in Agarak with frequent Persian-language signs, and many of the locals engaged in services are proficient in colloquial Persian.

Demographics
The population of Agarak since 1908 is as follows:

References 

Populated places in Syunik Province
Cities and towns built in the Soviet Union
Populated places established in 1949
Armenia–Iran border crossings